Shango is an album by Nigerian afrobeat tenor saxophonist Peter King. It was released in 1974, by Mr Bongo Records.

Critical reception
Thom Jurek of AllMusic explained the release "is a mixture of hard African rhythms, James Brown-styled funk, jazzed-up horn arrangements, and political messages. From the standpoint of the Lagos scene, the album is a classic of the period rivaling virtually anything that Fela or Tony Allen were putting across at the time. With King blowing deep-groove soul and out jazz saxophone solos above the chants, the music becomes a boiling pot of hip-shaking sexiness and rage." Writing for London Jazz News, Andrew Cartmel praised the keyboard work throughout the album by saying that it is "strikingly high standard, perhaps reaching a psychedelic peak on Watusi where it suggests Return to Forever-era Chick Corea."

Track listing

References

1974 albums